Gisborne Airport  is a regional airport located in the suburb of Elgin 4.2 km from the city centre of Gisborne on the East Coast of the North Island of New Zealand. Gisborne Airport is one of the few airports in the world that has a railway line, the Palmerston North–Gisborne Line, crossing the main runway. The airport has a single terminal with four tarmac gates. Gisborne Airport covers an area of around 160 hectares. It includes a sealed and night-capable runway (Rwy 14/32) at 1,310 metres in length, as well as three grass runways suitable for light aircraft.

It was announced on 7 September 2018 that the airport will receive a $5.5 million redevelopment loan to ensure that the airport terminal reflects the unique cultural aspects of the Gisborne region, closely linking with the region's navigation-themed tourism initiative.

Eastland Group management
On 16 December 2004, Gisborne District Council (who own and previously operated the airport) voted to let Eastland Group manage the airport and lease the assets from 1 April 2005. Gisborne District Council still remains owner of the assets. The lease runs for 15 years with an option to extend it for a further 15 years.
Quote from Eastland Group's website Eastland Group pays Gisborne District Council an annual rental fee indexed to passenger numbers and is accountable for all capital investment.  It bears all risk associated with the airports profitability, eliminating the need for ratepayer subsidy.
Since taking over, Eastland Group has created a new airport cafe 'V2', and a new airport logo.

Airlines and destinations

Statistics

See also

 List of airports in New Zealand
 List of airlines of New Zealand
 Transport in New Zealand

Sources 
NZAIP Volume 4 AD
Eastland Group website

References

External links 
 Gisborne Airport
 Eastland Group

Gisborne, New Zealand
Airports in New Zealand
Buildings and structures in Gisborne, New Zealand
Transport in the Gisborne District
Transport buildings and structures in the Gisborne District